Mahawatta South Grama Niladhari Division is a Grama Niladhari Division of the Kundasale Divisional Secretariat of Kandy District of Central Province, Sri Lanka. It has Grama Niladhari Division Code 687.

Mahawatta South is a surrounded by the Galapitaambe, Hapuwala, Mahawatta East, Pilawala South, Galmaduwa, Arangala North, Arangala South, Mahawatta West and Nattarampotha Grama Niladhari Divisions.

Demographics

Ethnicity 

The Mahawatta South Grama Niladhari Division has a Sinhalese majority (98.6%). In comparison, the Kundasale Divisional Secretariat (which contains the Mahawatta South Grama Niladhari Division) has a Sinhalese majority (82.6%)

Religion 

The Mahawatta South Grama Niladhari Division has a Buddhist majority (97.0%). In comparison, the Kundasale Divisional Secretariat (which contains the Mahawatta South Grama Niladhari Division) has a Buddhist majority (81.4%)

Gallery

References 

Grama Niladhari divisions of Sri Lanka
Kandy District